The Magnificent Flirt is a lost 1928 American comedy silent film directed by Harry d'Abbadie d'Arrast and written by José Germain Drouilly, Herman J. Mankiewicz, Harry d'Abbadie d'Arrast and Jean de Limur. The film stars Florence Vidor, Albert Conti, Loretta Young, Matty Kemp, Marietta Millner and Ned Sparks. The film was released on June 2, 1928, by Paramount Pictures.

Plot
Count D'Estrange tries to save his nephew Hubert from Denise Laverne he believes a heartless flirt. Denise's mother Mme. Florence Laverne uses all her charms to solve the problems. Finally Count D'Estrange marries Mme. Florence Laverne. Both couples leave for a honeymoon in Venice.

Cast 
Florence Vidor as Mme. Florence Laverne
Albert Conti as Count D'Estrange
Loretta Young as Denise Laverne
Matty Kemp as Hubert
Marietta Millner as Fifi
Ned Sparks as Tim

References

External links 
 

1928 films
1920s English-language films
Silent American comedy films
1928 comedy films
Lost American films
Paramount Pictures films
American black-and-white films
American silent feature films
1928 lost films
Lost comedy films
Films directed by Harry d'Abbadie d'Arrast
1920s American films